{{Automatic taxobox
| fossil_range = 
| image = Lajasvenator ascheriae Wikipedia Juandertal.jpg
| image_caption = Reconstruction of the animal based on its fossil remains and those of its close relatives| taxon = Lajasvenator
| authority = Coria et al., 2020
| type_species = Lajasvenator ascheriae| type_species_authority = Coria et al., 2020
| subdivision_ranks = 
| subdivision = 
}}Lajasvenator (meaning "Las Lajas hunter" after the city of Las Lajas in Neuquén, Argentina) is a genus of carcharodontosaurid dinosaur from the Mulichinco Formation from Neuquén Province in Argentina. The type and only species is Lajasvenator ascheriae.

References 

Carcharodontosaurids
Valanginian life
Early Cretaceous dinosaurs of South America
Cretaceous Argentina
Fossil taxa described in 2020